The genus Neophema is an Australian genus with six or seven species. They are small, basically dull green  parrots differentiated by patches of other colours, and are commonly known as grass parrots. The genus has some sexual dichromatism, with males having brighter hues.

Taxonomy
Sometimes the broad-tailed parrots are considered a subfamily. In this case, Neophema and Bourke's parrot are united in the tribe Neophemini. mtDNA sequence data (Miyaki et al. 1998) suggests that the former may be correct, but the latter almost certainly is not. Rather, it appears, the group would need to include more closely related forms, such as the budgerigar and the Pezoporus ground-parrots. However, while Joseph et al. (2011) also found Neophema to be related both Bourke's parrot and ground-parrots and form part of the tribe Pezoporini, they are not related to the budgerigar.

Analysis of mitochondrial DNA published in 2021 indicated the ancestors of Bourke's parrot and the remaining Neophema parrots most likely diverged between 6.4 and 8 million years ago; the Neophema lineage diverged again, with one giving rise to the turquoise and scarlet-chested parrots, and the other to the four remaining species. Of these four, the ancestor of the orange-bellied parrot diverged next, then the elegant parrot, leaving the blue-winged and rock parrot as each others' closest relatives.

Species
There are 6 or 7 species:

 Blue-winged parrot, Neophema chrysostoma
 Elegant parrot, Neophema elegans
 Rock parrot, Neophema petrophila
 Orange-bellied parrot, Neophema chrysogaster
 Turquoise parrot, Neophema pulchella
 Scarlet-chested parrot, Neophema splendida

Depending on the author, Neopsephotus bourkii (Bourke's parrot) may also be considered a member of this genus.

Aviculture
The scarlet-chested parrot, turquoise parrot and elegant parrot are all commonly raised and bred in captivity with a number of unusual colour forms arising. The members of this genus are not altogether easy to keep, being tender birds that may die without apparent cause, succumbing to mobbing by more robust aviary mates or diseases. This has hampered captive propagation efforts, e.g. in the case of the critically endangered orange-bellied parrot.

They are certainly not "beginner's birds" and will usually not thrive if they are not provided with a spacious aviary where a small flock can be kept in company of a few other small and harmless birds. It is possible to keep a pair or a single bird in a cage, but they will be sluggish and unhealthy if they are not let out to fly and socialize with humans frequently. Trade in wild-caught specimens is strongly restricted; in any case, these should be rejected because they are extremely tough to accustomize to aviary conditions. It is usually impossible, even for expert aviculturalists, to keep wild-caught birds alive for more than a few months. Captive-bred birds of several species are available, and these are far more hardy, though inexperienced aviculturalists should avoid them nonetheless.

Popular in Australia and internationally, Neophema are sometimes referred to as 'grass parakeets' in avicultural literature. The most easily bred are Bourke's parrot (as Neophema), scarlet-chested parrot  (N. splendida), the turquoise parrot (N. pulchella), and elegant parrot (N. elegans), the most difficult and uncommon captive is the rock parrot (N. petrophila). Aside from Bourke's parrot, all are distinguished as predominantly green birds. The orange-bellied parrot has not been commercially available due to rarity and legal restriction.

References

 Miyaki, C. Y.; Matioli, S. R.; Burke, T. & Wajntal, A. (1998): Parrot evolution and paleogeographical events: Mitochondrial DNA evidence.  Molecular Biology and Evolution 15: 544–551. PDF fulltext
 Juniper & Parr (1998) Parrots: A Guide to Parrots of the World; .

 
Bird genera